Cosmopolitan Theatre is an American anthology series which aired on the DuMont Television Network Tuesdays at 9pm ET from October 2, 1951 to December 25, 1951.

Synopsis
The series consisted of live presentations of stories written for Cosmopolitan magazine, and was one of many TV series airing "tele-plays" at the time.

Episode status
Certain episodes exist within private collections.  Precisely how many episodes exist remains unknown.

Episodes

See also
List of programs broadcast by the DuMont Television Network
List of surviving DuMont Television Network broadcasts
1951-52 United States network television schedule

References

Bibliography
David Weinstein, The Forgotten Network: DuMont and the Birth of American Television (Philadelphia: Temple University Press, 2004) 
Alex McNeil, Total Television, Fourth edition (New York: Penguin Books, 1980) 
Tim Brooks and Earle Marsh, The Complete Directory to Prime Time Network TV Shows, Third edition (New York: Ballantine Books, 1964)

External links
 
 Cosmopolitan Theatre at CVTA with episode list
 DuMont historical website

1951 American television series debuts
1951 American television series endings
1950s American anthology television series
American live television series
Black-and-white American television shows
DuMont Television Network original programming
English-language television shows
Cosmopolitan (magazine)